The Shanghai maglev train or Shanghai Transrapid is a magnetic levitation train (maglev) line that operates in Shanghai, China.
It is  the fastest commercial electric train and also the fastest overall operational rail network in the world.

The train line connects Shanghai Pudong International Airport (transfer to Line 2) and Longyang Road Station (in the outskirts of central Pudong, transfer to Lines 2, 7, 16, and 18), where passengers can interchange to the Shanghai Metro to continue their trip to the city center. The line is not part of the Shanghai Metro network, which operates its own service to Pudong Airport from central Shanghai and Longyang Road Station (Line 2).

A train can reach  in 2 minutes and 15 seconds, with the maximum normal operation speed of  reached after 4 minutes.

History

Construction
Construction of the line began on March 1, 2001, and public commercial service commenced on 1 January 2004. The Shanghai Transrapid project took ¥10 billion (US$1.33bn) and two and a half years to complete. The line is  track and has a further separate track leading to a maintenance facility.

The train set model (SMT Transrapid) was built by a joint venture of Siemens and ThyssenKrupp from Kassel in 3 pieces (originally 4 pieces consisting of 6 wagons each were planned), Germany and based on years of tests and improvements of their Transrapid maglev monorail. The Shanghai Maglev track (guideway) was built by local Chinese companies who, as a result of the alluvial soil conditions of the Pudong area, had to deviate from the original track design of one supporting column every 50 metres to one column every 25 meters, to ensure that the guideway meets the stability and precision criteria. Several thousand concrete piles were driven to depths up to 70 metres to attain stability for the support column foundations. A mile-long, climate-controlled facility was built alongside the line's right of way to manufacture the guideways. The train was manufactured in Germany by Siemens-Thyssenkrupp JV (Joint venture).

The electrification of the train was developed by Vahle, Inc. Two commercial maglev systems predated the Shanghai system: the Birmingham Maglev in the United Kingdom and the Berlin M-Bahn. Both were low-speed operations and closed before the opening of the Shanghai maglev train.

The train was inaugurated in December 2002 by the German chancellor, Gerhard Schröder, and the Chinese premier, Zhu Rongji. Initial opening was for tour only, providing a round trip. The train starts from Longyang Rd. Station, speed up to 431 km/h and arrives at Pudong Airport. After very short break, the train returns without opening the door. The price was 150 RMB for normal seats and 300 RMB for VIP seat. The normal operation started on 10 October 2003.

Since 2010, a fourth train of Chinese production (made by Chengdou Aircraft Industries) has been added to the rolling stock. Its design slightly differs from the original Transrapid-trains: separated front lights below the shortened front-windows (instead of being placed behind the windows) and interior design.

Plans for a Maglev network in China
Hans-Dieter Bott, vice president of Siemens that won the contract to build the rail link, stated that "Transrapid views the Shanghai line, where the ride will last just eight minutes, largely as a sales tool. This serves as a demonstration for China to show that this works and can be used for longer distances, such as Shanghai to Beijing". Later, however, the decision was eventually made to implement the Beijing–Shanghai high-speed railway with conventional high-speed technology. Plans for a shorter maglev extension from Longyang Road to Hangzhou, the Shanghai–Hangzhou maglev line, have been suspended.

Speculation that a line would be built from Shanghai to Beijing mounted in 2002. The chief executive of ThyssenKrupp, Dr Ekkehard Schulz said he was certain that not only Germany, but many countries would follow the Chinese example. The German government along with a selection of German companies sought to win more projects for their maglev technology, and highlighted that a train between Shanghai and the Chinese capital, Beijing remained a possibility. No projects have been revealed as of 2014.

Plans for extensions of the Maglev line
In January 2006, the Shanghai–Hangzhou maglev line extension project was proposed by the Shanghai Urban Planning Administrative Bureau. The extension would continue the existing line towards Shanghai Hongqiao International Airport, running via Shanghai South railway station and the Expo 2010 site, with a possible continuation towards Hangzhou. The section between the two Shanghai airports is also referred to as Airport express line.

The plan for the extension to Hangzhou was first approved by the central government in February 2006, with a planned date of completion in 2010, to be built by Germany's Transrapid consortium (mainly ThyssenKrupp and Siemens). Work was suspended in 2008, owing to public protests over radiation fears
despite an environmental assessment by the Shanghai Academy of Environmental Sciences saying the line was safe and would not affect air and water quality, and noise pollution could be controlled.
In January and February 2008, hundreds of residents demonstrated in downtown Shanghai against the line being built close to their homes.  The residents were reportedly concerned with potential health hazards, noise, and loss of property value.  The Shanghai scheme has a buffer zone around the track that will be 22.5 m wide, which compares unfavourably with German standards that require houses to be 300 m away from the line.  Representatives of the residents filed a formal request to demonstrate with the Shanghai Public Security Bureau, which was rejected. According to China Daily, as reported on People's Daily Online 27 February 2009, the Shanghai municipal government was considering building the maglev line underground to allay the public's fear of electromagnetic pollution and the final decision on the maglev line had to be approved by the National Development and Reform commission.

The total length would have been 169 km (105 mi), of which 64 km (40 mi) would be within the City of Shanghai and 105 km (65 mi) in the province of Zhejiang. Four stations would be built: at the Expo 2010 site in east Shanghai; in south Shanghai; Jiaxing; and east Hangzhou. The proposed design speed was 450 km/h, which would allow the train to travel the distance in just 27 minutes. The total budget of the project was to be 35 billion RMB (about US$5.0 billion as of April 2008).

Another approval was granted in March 2010, with construction to begin in late 2010.

In October 2010 the non-maglev Shanghai–Hangzhou High-Speed Railway was opened, bringing travelling time between the two cities down to 45 minutes. Consequently, plans for a Maglev link have been suspended again.

In addition, a new express Airport Link line (机场联络线), which began construction in June 2019 and is due for completion in 2024, would likely stop any future extension.

Ridership
Following the opening, overall maglev train ridership levels were at 20% of capacity. The levels were attributed to limited operating hours, the short length of the line, high ticket prices and that it terminates at Longyang Road in Pudong – another 20 min by subway from the city centre.

 In February 2003, the Shanghai Maglev train transported 18,000 guests during the first nine days of the Lunar New Year;
 As of August 31, 2004, the total passenger capacity of Shanghai Maglev trains reached 1.45 million, and the total safe operation mileage reached 1.02 million kilometers;
 As of the end of March 2006, the cumulative safe operating mileage of Shanghai Maglev trains exceeded 2.4 million kilometers, carrying 6.23 million passengers;
 On October 1, 2007, the single-day passenger flow of Shanghai Maglev Train exceeded 20,000 for the first time; Anecdotal evidence says that the morning trains are 60-70% full each time they run;
 In 2010, due to increased tourists from World Expo 2010, the maglev had their largest passenger traffic;
 Traffic decreased a lot because of the opening of Shanghai metro line 2 east extension rail linking to Pudong Airport. Since then, the annual traffic has been stabilized to 3 million around in between 2011 and 2014;
 In 2014 the maglev had 6.6% sharing ratio of landside transport in Pudong International Airport, a decrease from 11.3% in 2005 (metro had a share of 33% in 2014);
 As of September 5, 2017, Shanghai Maglev trains have transported a total of 50 million passengers and safely operated 16.88 million kilometers.

Operation
The line is operated by Shanghai Maglev Transportation Development Co., Ltd and runs from 06:45 to 21:30, with services every 15 to 20 minutes. Operation hours:
 Until 2005, the train ran 8:30-15:30. These hours failed to serve a high number of flights from the Pudong airport that leave and arrive early in the morning or late at night;
 Between 2005 and 2007, the operation hours were extended to 7:00-21:00;
 From October 2007, operation hours were extended to coincide with the operating hours of the Metro Line 2, 6:45-21:30. Current (2022) operating hours of line 2 are 6.30-23.00; operating hours of the maglev have not been extended.

In addition to the above 57 daily two-way services, two additional one-way scheduled trains starts off at 10:15 pm and 10:40 pm from Pudong Airport to Longyang Road for about 8 minutes since October 2016.
Travel time was sped up considerably, as the  journey takes 45 minutes by road.

Stations

Pricing
A one-way ticket costs ¥50 (US$8), or ¥40 ($6.40) for those passengers holding a receipt or proof of an airline ticket purchase. A round-trip return ticket costs ¥80 ($12.80) and VIP tickets cost double the standard fare. The price has not changed since the Maglev began operation.

Operating costs
It cost $39.759 million per kilometer to build (10 billion yuan (1.2 billion US dollars) for the line).  The line's balance of payments has been in huge deficit since its opening.

In its initial years of operation, the Shanghai Maglev Transportation Development Co. Ltd, the company that runs the line, had more than one billion RMB in losses.  Nevertheless, the line's lack of profitability derives from its construction to envision the future of China's rail infrastructure, such as converting its entire high-speed rail network into maglev, rather than a viable market solution to garner a profit from travelers.

A 2007 statement by Transrapid USA said with 4 million passengers in 2006 the system was able to cover its operating costs. The ratio of costs were given as: 64%-energy, 19%-maintenance, and 17%-operations/support services; no overall amount of expenditures was given.  The high proportion of energy costs was attributed to the short trip time and high operating speed.
According to Chinese media's report, however, due to the huge costs of operating and the lack of the passenger flow, Shanghai Maglev Transportation Company would lose 500 million to 700 million RMB every year.

Incidents
On August 11, 2006 at 14:40, a Maglev train compartment caught fire after leaving Pudong International Airport. There were no injuries or fatalities aboard. Electrical problems caused the fire according to investigation reports.

On 14 February 2016, the Shanghai maglev line had an equipment failure that affected operation for more than 1 hour. Due to the use of single-line operation during this time, the train interval was extended.

Shanghai maglev museum
Maglev  Station offers Shanghai Maglev Transportation Science and Technology Museum, located at 2100 Longyang Road, Pudong New Area (Shanghai Maglev Train  Station ground floor). Open from 09:00 to 17:00.
It showcases Shanghai Maglev related content with an exhibition space of 1250 square meters, containing most of the history and technology of maglev train. The museum is composed of five sections: “Birth of Maglev,” “Maglev Shanghai Line,” “Maglev Technology,” “Maglev Superiorities,” and “Prospects for Maglev.”

See also

 Incheon Airport Maglev
 Linimo
 Chuo Shinkansen
 Northeast Maglev
 Line S1 (Beijing Subway)
 Changsha Maglev Express

References

External links

 Official website
 International Maglev Board Shanghai
 Shanghai Maglev Photos

High-speed rail in China
Maglev
Shanghai Metro
Rail transport in Shanghai
Monorails in China
Airport rail links in China